Luther Stearns Cushing (June 22, 1803June 22, 1856) was an American jurist. He was born on June 22, 1803, in Lunenburg, Massachusetts, and died on June 22, 1856, in Boston.

Cushing wrote one of the earliest works on parliamentary procedure, Rules of Proceeding and Debate in Deliberative Assemblies, commonly known as Cushing's Manual. The first edition was published in 1845. Afterwards, others continued to revise the manual periodically.

Notable later editions
Allison, William L. Cushing's Manual of Parliamentary Practice (1886)
Sullivan, Frances P. Cushing's Manual of Parliamentary Practice (1887, 1905)
Baker, James Freeman. Cushing's Manual of Parliamentary Practice (1890)
Ingalls, John James, Cushing's Manual of Parliamentary Practice (1895)
Bolles, Albert S. Cushing's Manual of Parliamentary Practice (1901, with printings thru 1935)
Bolles, Albert S. Cushing's Manual of Parliamentary Practice with Rules of Procedure in Business Corporations (1901, 1914)
Gaines, Charles Kelsey, The New Cushing's Manual of Parliamentary Practice (1912)
Lowe, Paul E. Cushing's Manual of Parliamentary Practice (1925)
Cushing, Luther S. Modern Rules of Order (1964)

References

1803 births
1856 deaths
Parliamentary authority
People from Lunenburg, Massachusetts